Football at the 2003 South Pacific Games in Suva, Fiji was held from 30 June to 30 July 2003.

Medal summary

Medal table

Results

References

 
2003 South Pacific Games
Pacific Games
2003
2003 South Pacific Games